German submarine U-172 was a Type IXC U-boat of Nazi Germany's Kriegsmarine during World War II. She was first assigned to the 4th U-boat Flotilla for training and on 1 May 1942 was reassigned to the 10th flotilla, an operational long-range organization.

Design
German Type IXC submarines were slightly larger than the original Type IXBs. U-172 had a displacement of  when at the surface and  while submerged. She had two shafts and two  propellers.

U-172 was fitted with six  torpedo tubes (four fitted at the bow and two at the stern), 22 torpedoes, one  SK C/32 naval gun, 180 rounds, and a  SK C/30 as well as a  C/30 anti-aircraft gun. The boat had a complement of forty-eight.

Service history
U-172 was laid down at the DeSchiMAG AG Weser yard in Bremen as yard number 1012. She was launched on 31 July 1941 and commissioned on 5 November under the command of Kapitänleutnant Carl Emmermann. She conducted six patrols, sinking 26 ships totalling. She was sunk by American aircraft and warships in December 1943, west of the Canary Islands.

First patrol
U-172s first patrol commenced with her departure from Kiel on 24 April 1942. Her route took her through the Kattegat and Skaggerak, through the gap between the Faroe and Shetland Islands and into the Atlantic Ocean. She arrived at her new base at Lorient in occupied France on 3 May. She would use this port as her base for the rest of her career.

Second patrol
Having left Lorient on 11 May 1942, the boat moved into the mid-Atlantic and sank Athelknight southeast of Bermuda on the 27th. Moving to the eastern Caribbean Sea, she sank three more ships, City of Alma, Delfina and Sicilien in early June.

She attacked Lebore on the 14th, which assumed a 45° list to starboard on being hit. The ship was struck again in the engine room followed by fire from the U-boat's deck gun. A third torpedo caused the ship to capsize. Twelve more deck gun rounds and a 'coup de grâce' sent the ship to the bottom. Casualties were relatively light, the first assistant engineer was the only fatality, leaving 93 men to be rescued by US warships.

Four more vessels were consigned to watery graves. One of them, the Colombian sailing ship Resolute, was stopped with U-172s 20mm gun and sunk with grenades. Another, Santa Rita, had been abandoned by her crew, but was still afloat. A party from the U-boat boarded her and set scuttling charges. The master was found and taken prisoner. He was landed at Lorient when the submarine returned to base and was transferred, initially to Wilhelmshaven then the POW camp at Milag Nord near Bremen.

Third patrol
U-172 left Lorient for her third sortie on 19 August 1942. It would be her longest (131 days) and in terms of tonnage sunk, most successful patrol.

She was first struck by two torpedoes, but following a third hit, a skeleton crew, gunners and volunteers from the passengers remained on board to try and save the ship. They included a Petty Officer telegraphist who sent a second distress call after the radio operators had abandoned their position. In all, Orcades was hit by six torpedoes before sinking with a broken back. Forty-five men died, but there were 1,022 survivors who were saved by SS Narwik.

Following the sinking of Aldington Court on 31 October, the survivors were only spotted and picked up by City of Christiania when the third officer climbed a lifeboat's mast and waved a shirt.

 was another victim sunk, on 23 November. The only survivor of this attack was Poon Lim, who eked out an existence for 133 days in the South Atlantic on a Carley float, (a type of liferaft). He received the British Empire Medal from King George VI for this feat.

Fourth patrol
One of the passengers had already survived 51 days in a lifeboat from a previous sinking. This time he was not so lucky - nor were the other occupants of the ship; there were no survivors.

U-172 sank three other ships; one of them, had been a member of the ill-fated Convoy PQ 17.

The submarine did not escape unscathed; while attacking convoy RS-3 on 28 March, as one of eight U-boats, she was seriously damaged but still managed to sink Moanda on the 29th. She was also attacked on 7 April by two B-24 Liberators of 1 Squadron, USAAF south of the Azores. Despite having 12 depth charges dropped on her, she stayed on the surface, fought it out and sustained no damage.

The boat returned to Lorient on 17 April.

Fifth patrol
For her fifth patrol, U-172 moved into the waters of the South Atlantic, departing Lorient on 29 May 1943. Having sunk Vernon City south southeast of St Paul Rocks (between South America and Africa) on 28 June, she headed toward the Brazilian coast, where she caused the destruction of three more ships: African Star (12 July), Harmonic (15 July) and Fort Chilcotin (24 July).

One man from U-172 was killed.

Sixth patrol and loss
U-172 left Lorient for the last time on 22 November 1943. The battle between U-172 and the small armada of ships and aircraft lasted for 27 hours and as many as 200 depth charges were dropped by the destroyers. Thirteen of U-172s crew were killed; 46 survived the sinking.

Wolfpacks
U-172 took part in three wolfpacks, namely:
Eisbär (25 August - 1 September 1942) 
Unverzagt (12 – 17 March 1943) 
Seeräuber (25 – 30 March 1943)

Summary of raiding history

References

Bibliography

External links

German Type IX submarines
U-boats commissioned in 1941
U-boats sunk in 1943
World War II submarines of Germany
1941 ships
World War II shipwrecks in the Atlantic Ocean
Ships built in Bremen (state)
U-boats sunk by US aircraft
U-boats sunk by US warships
Maritime incidents in December 1943